Dajan Šimac (born 4 January 1982) is a Croatian professional footballer who plays as a defender for NK Marsonia. He also holds German citizenship.

Club career

Germany
Born in Bingen am Rhein, West Germany, Šimac played in the youth teams of Blau-Weiß Münster-Sarmsheim (1989–1996) and BFV Hassia Bingen (1996–2000). He made his debut as senior playing with 1. FC Kaiserslautern II in the 2001–02 season. After two seasons with them in the Regionalliga Süd.  In summer 2003 he moved to SpVgg Greuther Fürth however he played only one match in the 2003–04 2. Bundesliga.  During the winter break of that season he moved to SV Wehen Wiesbaden.  He played there for five-and-a-half seasons making 138 league appearances and scoring six goals.  He will play with Wehen in the Regionalliga Süd until 2007 when they were promoted to the 2. Bundesliga and he played with them two seasons in the second German level (56 appearances and six goals).  In summer 2007 he moved to another 2. Bundesliga side, FSV Frankfurt and stay with them one season.

Debrecen
In summer 2010 Šimac moved to Hungary by signing with Debreceni VSC. On 1 May 2012, he won the Hungarian Cup with Debrecen by beating MTK Budapest on penalty shoot-out in the 2011–12 season. This was the fifth Hungarian Cup trophy for Debrecen.

On 12 May 2012, Šimac won the Hungarian League title with Debrecen after beating Pécs in the 28th round of the Hungarian League by 4–0 at the Oláh Gábor út Stadium which resulted the sixth Hungarian League title for the Hajdús.

Denizlispor
In summer 2013 Šimac left Debrecen after three years, and moved to Turkey by signing with Denizlispor.  He made 10 appearances with them in the first half of the 2013–14 TFF First League.

Jagodina
During the winter break of the 2013–14 season, Šimac left Denizlispor and moved to Serbia signing a 6-months contract with SuperLiga side FK Jagodina.

Later career in Croatia
After his spell in Serbia, he stayed in the region and debuted for the first time in his home-country Croatia when he joined Radnik Sesvete in summer 2015 playing in second level. Later he played with Stupnik and Samobor. In season 2017–18 he played with NK Tekstilac-Ravnice.

International career
Šimac played one match for the Croatian U-20 team in 2003.

Career statistics

Honours
Wehen Wiesbaden
 Regionalliga Süd: 2006–07

Debreceni VSC
 Hungarian Championship: 2011–12
 Hungarian Cup: 2012, 2013
 Hungarian Supercup: 2011
 Hungarian Supercup runner-up: 2013

Jagodina
 Serbian Cup runner-up: 2014

References

External links
 

1982 births
Living people
People from Bingen am Rhein
German people of Croatian descent
Footballers from Rhineland-Palatinate
Association football defenders
German footballers
Croatian footballers
Croatia youth international footballers
BFV Hassia Bingen players
1. FC Kaiserslautern II players
SpVgg Greuther Fürth players
SV Wehen Wiesbaden players
FSV Frankfurt players
Debreceni VSC players
Denizlispor footballers
FK Jagodina players
NK Sesvete players
NK Samobor players
NK Marsonia players
2. Bundesliga players
Nemzeti Bajnokság I players
TFF First League players
Serbian SuperLiga players
First Football League (Croatia) players
German expatriate footballers
German expatriate sportspeople in Hungary
Expatriate footballers in Hungary
German expatriate sportspeople in Turkey
Expatriate footballers in Turkey
German expatriate sportspeople in Serbia
Expatriate footballers in Serbia